Edward Manuel Fram (1905–1955) was a Christian Iraqi entrepreneur and philanthropist.

Business activities

Insurance
Living and working in Basra in what was then the Ottoman Empire, Edward Fram was a key figure in the country's modern insurance industry, as the owner of one of Iraq's first insurance agencies operating under the Insurance Companies Act No. 74 (1 April 1936). This was the first Iraqi law passed to specifically regulate the industry. Prior to this, only 3 insurance companies were known to be operating in Iraq, under the Ottoman Commercial Law of 9 August 1904, one of which was the General Accident Fire and Life Assurance Corporation (now Aviva Insurance Ltd.) from 1928. By the time of the nationalisation of the industry in 1964, there were still just 15 branches and agencies of regional (Arab) and foreign insurance companies across Iraq, including Egypt's Al-Chark Insurance Company. Al-Chark (part of Misr Insurance since 2007) was the first to set up an agency in Transjordan towards the end of the 1940s and was one of the first in Iraq, where Edward Fram acted as their agent from as early as 1936. Fram also represented France's oldest insurer L’Union de Paris (later UAP, now part of AXA) and other insurance companies, along with Shafiq Ades, Andrew Weir, 1st Baron Inverforth and other notable businessmen.

Bonds and securities
Fram was one of the first and main players in Basra's nascent bonds and securities markets from the mid-1930s. His name is the only one listed in the Basra bonds section within Iraq's sole pre-Baathist business directory, published by the Interior Ministry in 1936.

Other
Fram was a major goods importer, exporter, makers' representative and also acted as the exclusive agent in Iraq for Selfridges, amongst other western companies. During the Second World War, he provided housing for British troops as part of the development of Basra as a "large-scale base" and traded scrap metal left by the British military after the war, as did other well-known merchants such as Naji Al-Khedhairi. Fram also ran the Basra office of Iraq Tours, the country's first travel agency, which had Iraqi Prime Minister Tawfiq al-Suwaydi as chairman, and which played a key role in Operation Ezra and Nehemiah alongside the Near East Transport Company and the Israeli national airline El Al.

Death 
Edward Fram died aged 50 in a car accident, a short distance from his hometown of Basra, on his return from a visit to the Hanna-Sheikh family's Abu Al-Khaseeb retreat. A member of the Al-Sa'adoon family with whom he was travelling also died in the crash, along with the chauffeur.

Family and legacy 
Edward Fram was survived by seven children (five daughters, two sons) and his wife, Salima (1920–1961). His youngest daughter, Thelma Edward Marougy (née Fram), is a fluid specialist at Eaton Corporation. Edward Fram is the grandfather of American technology executive and namesake, Edward Y Abbo, formerly Senior Vice President at Oracle Corporation and currently President and Chief Technical Officer at C3 IoT, a data analytics company founded in 2009 by Tom Siebel. He is also the grandfather of Michael Y Abbo, an emergency physician and assistant clinical professor at the University of California San Francisco, Ayad Sarraf, former manager of Fulham Deaf FC and now club secretary, and Sally Fram, PhD - a British cancer expert and regulatory affairs executive at AstraZeneca. Edward Fram is the great-grandfather of Rafi Allos, an intellectual property specialist and partner at Allen and Overy.

References

1905 births
1955 deaths
20th-century Iraqi businesspeople
Iraqi philanthropists
Iraqi Christians
20th-century philanthropists